Eelyn Kok Hui Wen is a Singaporean actress. She was prominently a full-time MediaCorp artist from 2001 to 2013, but continues to film on an ad hoc basis.

Career
Kok was first spotted in SPH MediaWorks's talent show Route to Glamour in 2001 and was a contestant alongside Jeanette Aw and Adam Chen. Although she did not win, she was offered a contract with MediaWorks and later joined MediaCorp in 2005 when the two companies merged.

Kok started her acting career playing supporting roles in her starting years, frequently portraying villainous characters such as in The Little Nyonya. She was nominated for the Best Supporting Actress category in 2009 but lost to winners Xiang Yun and Ng Hui.

In August 2009, Kok starred in My Buddy as the first female lead, alongside established actors Christopher Lee and Aileen Tan. In the same year, she played Huang Jinhao in the Channel 8 blockbuster drama, Together. The role of Jinhao was originally intended for Fiona Xie but it went to Eelyn when Fiona was unable to take the role due to personal reasons. Kok's performance in Together saw her popularity rise and earned her a Best Actress nomination in Star Awards 2010.

Kok appeared in two dramas in 2010, Precious Babes and The Family Court. She also starred in the 2011 year-end anniversary series A Song To Remember opposite Joanne Peh and Qi Yuwu.

Personal life
Kok studied at Bukit Panjang Government High School and National Junior College, and graduated from the National University of Singapore where she majored in Economics and Japanese.

Kok also has experience as a part-time model, which she earned during her school days.

Kok is a Christian. She has been a guest speaker at Hope Church Singapore, and at All Saint's English.

Kok married Goh, a former IT professional in the auditing industry, on 10 October 2010.  She gave birth to a son, Zane, on 1 April 2013.

Kok has been candid about her bout of depression when she was 23 and just starting out her acting career. Her symptoms included seclusion, laying in one place for prolonged periods, crying, and not showering for weeks. She has further stated that she also experienced lethargy, melancholy, had difficulty sleeping, and became antisocial, locking herself in her room for up to six months. Upon doing research online, she realised her condition and sought professional help. She said the close timing of a failed first relationship with her mother's battle with advanced stage cervical cancer was ultimately the trigger. Her mother died of cancer in 2003.

Filmography

Television

Accolades

References

External links
Profile on xin.msn.com
Profile on LinkedIn
Profile on Instagram
Personal blog on blogspot.com
Fan forum on proboards.com

Singaporean television actresses
1979 births
Living people
Peranakan people in Singapore
National Junior College alumni
National University of Singapore alumni